The Schweizerische Numismatische Rundschau (translation: Swiss Numismatic Review) is one of the two peer reviewed multilingual journals of the Swiss Numismatic Society. Containing articles of the highest scientific level in the field of international numismatics and economic history from antiquity to modern times, the SNR is also known as a main publication for Swiss numismatics.

Editorial Board
 Michael Alram, Vienna
 Michel Amandry, Paris
 Wolfgang Fischer-Bossert, Vienna
 Hans-Ulrich Geiger, Zurich
 Lutz Ilisch, Tübingen
 Ulrich Klein, Stuttgart
 Denis Knoepfler, Neuchâtel
 William E. Metcalf, Connecticut
 Markus Peter, Augst
 Samuele Ranucci, Perugia
 Lucia Travaini, Milan

External links

Numismatics journals